Horace and Grace Bush House, also known as Bush-Fellows Residence, is a historic home located at Penfield in Monroe County, New York. It is an 1821 Federal style structure with Greek Revival period additions and embellishments.  The main block is a two-story, five bay post and beam structure sheathed in clapboard.  It is regular and symmetrical in massing and plan.  The house was moved to its current location in 1931.

It was listed on the National Register of Historic Places in 1994.

Gallery

References

Houses on the National Register of Historic Places in New York (state)
Federal architecture in New York (state)
Houses completed in 1821
Houses in Monroe County, New York
National Register of Historic Places in Monroe County, New York